Matterhorn is the highest mountain in the Jarbidge Mountains of northern Elko County, Nevada, United States. It is the fifteenth-most topographically prominent peak in the state. The summit is located in the Jarbidge Wilderness, which is administered by the Jarbidge Ranger District of the Humboldt-Toiyabe National Forest. Its name is derived from the Matterhorn in the Alps of Europe, due mainly to the cliffs located immediately adjacent to the summit on the north and northeast.

Summit panorama

References

Mountains of Elko County, Nevada
Mountains of Nevada
Humboldt–Toiyabe National Forest